Hans Eidenbenz (January 30, 1900 – August 29, 1987) was a Swiss Nordic combined skier who competed in the 1920s. Competing in two Winter Olympics, his best finish was 15th in the Nordic combined event at Chamonix in 1924.

Eidenbenz also took the Olympic Oath at the 1928 Winter Olympics in St. Moritz.

References

External links
IOC 1928 Winter Olympics
Nordic combined results: 1924-36 

1900 births
1987 deaths
Cross-country skiers at the 1924 Winter Olympics
Nordic combined skiers at the 1924 Winter Olympics
Nordic combined skiers at the 1928 Winter Olympics
Ski jumpers at the 1924 Winter Olympics
Olympic cross-country skiers of Switzerland
Olympic Nordic combined skiers of Switzerland
Swiss male cross-country skiers
Swiss male Nordic combined skiers
Swiss male ski jumpers
Oath takers at the Olympic Games